Wierzchowiny  is a village in the administrative district of Gmina Siemień, within Parczew County, Lublin Voivodeship, in eastern Poland.

The village has a population of 1,200.

References

Wierzchowiny